The Power of Right is a 1919 British silent war film directed by Floyd Martin Thornton and starring James Knight, Evelyn Boucher and Frank Petley. The film had strong similarities to The Warrior Strain also featuring the Prince of Wales and directed by Thornton.

Cast
 James Knight as Gerald Stafford
 Evelyn Boucher as Elsie Vigor
 Frank Petley as Danvers
 Leslie Reardon as Leslie Stafford
 Sydney Grant
 Clifford Pembroke
 John Gliddon
 Adeline Hayden Coffin
 Prince of Wales as himself
 Marjorie Villis

References

Bibliography
 Bamford, Kenton. Distorted Images: British National Identity and Film in the 1920s. I.B. Tauris, 1999.

External links

1919 films
British war films
British silent feature films
1910s English-language films
Films directed by Floyd Martin Thornton
Films set in England
British black-and-white films
1919 war films
Silent war films
1910s British films